Leixlip ( or ;) is a town in north-east County Kildare, Ireland. Its location on the confluence of the River Liffey and the Rye Water has marked it as a frontier town historically: on the border between the ancient kingdoms of Leinster and Brega, as an outpost of The Pale, and on Kildare's border with County Dublin. Leixlip was also a civil parish in the ancient barony of Salt North.

As of 2016, the population of the town was 15,504. It is the fourth largest town in Kildare, and the 29th largest in Ireland.

Name
The placename comes from the Old Norse lax hlaup (Younger Futhark: ᛚᛅᚼᛋ ᚼᛚᛅᚢᛒ) which means "salmon leap". The name in the Irish language (Léim an Bhradáin) is a direct translation of this, and was first adopted in the 1890s. In Latin, it is Saltus salmonis, from which comes the names of the baronies of North Salt and South Salt.

History
Leixlip was a possible site of the Battle of Confey, in which the Viking King Sigtrygg Caech of Dublin defeated the Irish King of Leinster around the year 917. The first settlement at Leixlip was an outpost of Early Scandinavian Dublin, built at the furthest point where longships could be rowed up the Liffey. Its status as an outpost of Dublin continued for centuries, marking a border of The Pale.

The town was home to Arthur Guinness's first brewery in 1756, where he brewed ales until he moved on to St. James's Gate Brewery, Dublin in 1759.

The first history of the town was published in 2005.

Politics
Leixlip is part of the Kildare North constituency, which elects four members to Dáil Éireann.

Leixlip, with Celbridge, comprises the Celbridge-Leixlip electoral area, which elects seven members to Kildare County Council. Two of those members are based in Leixlip.

Between 1988 and 2014 Leixlip had a nine-member Town Council (formerly Leixlip Town Commissioners), headed by a Cathaoirleach (chairperson). In 1990, the town's coat of arms was presented by minister Pádraig Flynn. The Local Government Reform Act 2014 abolished town councils, including Leixlip's, in 2014.

Transport

Bus
Dublin Bus, and JJ Kavanagh and Sons, provide bus service. Dublin Bus run the spinal city bound C3 service, along with the non spinal city bound 52. Additionally, Leixlip is served at peak time by the X25, X31 and X32. Dublin Bus also provide the local L54, L58 and L59 bus services, which link Leixlip's housing estates together and also provide links to Celbridge and Clondalkin. JJ Kavanagh provide the regional 139 service, which links Leixlip with Naas and Blanchardstown.

Rail
Leixlip is connected to the Irish railway network on the Dublin-Sligo railway line, running from Dublin Connolly to Sligo, with two stations, Leixlip (Louisa Bridge), opened on 1 September 1848, and Leixlip (Confey), opened on 2 July 1990, located at either end of the town. While InterCity services to Sligo do not serve the town, the Maynooth/Longford Commuter services do, the frequency of the trains peaking in the mornings and evenings. Some of these services continue outbound to Mullingar and Longford. Leixlip has the distinction of being the only town in the Republic of Ireland with two operational train stations.

Air
Weston Airport is a publicly licensed airport. Its traffic is primarily private and commercial training. Dublin Airport is 20 minutes away from Leixlip via the M50 motorway.

Local attractions

Leixlip Castle
Built on a rock at the confluence of the River Liffey and the Rye Water, the central part of the castle dates from 1172, just after the Norman Invasion of 1171 and is one of the oldest continuously-inhabited buildings in Ireland, pre-dating Dublin Castle by 30 years. It was used as a hunting base by King John when Lord of Ireland in 1185. It was not of major military importance but withstood a 4-day siege by the army of Edward Bruce in 1316.

Leixlip and 809 acres around it (excluding the castle) were bought by William Conolly of nearby Castletown House for approximately £12,000 in 1728. The castle was bought by Conolly's nephew and heir, William James Conolly, in 1731. His family sold it in 1914. Various famous tenants of the Conollys in the castle included Archbishop Stone, the Protestant Primate (1750s), the Viceroy Lord Townshend (1770s), Lord Waterpark, and Baron de Robeck (who drowned at the Salmon Leap). In the 1920s it was the residence of the first French ambassador to the Irish Free State. In 1945 the castle was sold to William Kavanagh, prior to the purchase in 1958 by The Hon. Desmond Guinness. The castle features in the 1825 Gothic short story Leixlip Castle by Charles Maturin.

Castletown House & The Wonderful Barn
Located off the main street of nearby Celbridge, Castletown House is the first grand Palladian House in Ireland – the design of the building led to the construction of Leinster House and from thence to the White House in Washington, D.C. Begun in 1722 for Speaker William Conolly (1662–1729), Speaker of the Irish House of Commons, the lands and the house itself lie in Celbridge, however, there is also an entrance from Leixlip, hence there are two modern housing estates bearing the Castletown name, one in each town. To mark the eastern vista of Castletown a conical shaped building – The Wonderful Barn – was constructed in 1743 with the stairs ascending around the exterior of the building.

St. Catherine's Priory
St. Catherine's Priory was acquired by judge Nicholas White, and was an important monastery in the Middle Ages.

Confey Castle
British publisher and cartographer Samuel Lewis mentions Confey Castle in the first volume of his 1837 work A Topographical Dictionary of Ireland. In it, he comments that Confey's (or Confoy as he spells it) population was 165, had formerly had a town and a castle of some importance, which were noticed by Camden. Of the tower's remains were a massive five-storey structure with turrets at the north and west angles; that at the north angle containing a winding staircase opening through pointed arches into each storey. The principal entrance was under a semicircular archway. In the war of 1688 the castle is said to have been strongly garrisoned, and to have sustained an attack.

Leixlip Spa
Leixlip Spa was found in 1793 by workmen working on the construction of the Royal Canal, which runs through Leixlip.

Salmon Leap
Leixlip's main attraction in the past was the Salmon Leap, from which the town is named, a 5-metre waterfall on the Liffey just upstream from the then village.  A hydroelectric dam was completed in 1945, and its lake flooded the waterfall. The dam generates 4 Megawatts.

Religion
Leixlip is divided into two Roman Catholic Church parishes, Leixlip (Our Lady's Nativity) and Confey (St. Charles Borromeo), each with its own parish church. The Church of Ireland parish of St Mary's also has a church in Leixlip, located in Main Street. This medieval church was restyled in the 1750s with Gothic windows, and its belltower clock dates from 1720. People from Our Lady's Nativity parish also have their own identity separate from people in the Confey parish. The Confey parish members are known as 'Hillers' and people from the Our Lady's Nativity parish are known as 'Farenders'. There is the usual local rivalry associated with two different parishes which is particularly evident during sporting events.

Education and library
As with religion and sports, education in Leixlip is divided by the two Catholic parishes of Leixlip (Our Lady's Nativity) and Confey (St. Charles Borromeo).

The respective schools in the Confey district are Confey Community College (a community school), Scoil San Carlo (Junior), and Scoil San Carlo Senior School (both national schools). The community school of Confey College has approximately 750 pupils in total, and similarly to Coláiste Chiaráin is mixed gender and non-denominational. The name "San Carlo", while used as the Irish names of the national schools in the St Charles Borromeo parish, is actually the Italian rather than actual Irish translation (which would be "Naomh Cathal").

Leixlip also has one of the few Primary Montessori Schools in Ireland, Weston Primary Montessori School. Established in 2016 by the parents and teachers of the former Glebe School, this school provides Montessori education to children from 3–12 years and is located on the grounds of Barnhall Rugby Club.

A public library opened in Leixlip in May 2006. It is situated in Confey beside the Town Council Office. It is also near both Scoil San Carlo and Confey Train Station. Leixlip Library hosts a variety of events and activities as well as free Internet access to library members.

Shopping and local businesses 
The town has four supermarkets – a SuperValu, Eurospar, Aldi, and Lidl. As well as Eurospar, there are also three Spar convenience stores, Mace and a Tuthill's in Leixlip. The Liffey Valley Shopping Centre is a short drive down the N4, and Leixlip is also within reach of Dublin's shopping areas, including Blanchardstown Shopping Centre.

In addition to local supermarkets and convenience stores, there are several other local businesses. This includes businesses in the professional services sectors, such as solicitors, architects and insurance firms.

Festival
The Leixlip Festival (previously known as the Salmon Festival) has taken place every year since 1990 on the June bank holiday weekend. It offers live entertainment in pubs, a number of open-air concerts, street carnival and fireworks display.

Leixlip Salmon Festival Limited also provides a youth training scheme in association with Foras Áiseanna Saothair.

The festival has played host to bands such as The Coronas, Aslan in 2011, The Blizzards in 2017, The Hothouse Flowers, Republic of Loose, Delorentos in 2015 and The Riptide Movement in 2011, 2015 and 2019. Solo artists have also performed including Damien Dempsey and Niall Breslin.

Industry
Local Leixlip employers include Intel, who own a complex consisting of Fabs (fabrication plant) 10 & 14 (IFO), 24, and 24-2 of Intel's manufacturing operations. Hewlett Packard Enterprise was also a local employer, from 1995 until the closure of the facility in 2017. Most other employment in Leixlip is in retail businesses.

Notable people
Lily Allen, English recording artist, actress and fashion designer lived in Leixlip as a child and attended school there.
Trevor Brennan, Irish international rugby player
Emma Byrne, Republic of Ireland women's national football team and Arsenal goalkeeper
Jake Carroll, professional footballer, attended secondary school at Confey College in Leixlip.
Nathan Collins, professional footballer
Thomas Conolly, MP of both the Parliament of Great Britain (1759-1780) and Parliament of Ireland (1761-1800), was born in Leixlip
David Geraghty, musician and member of Bell X1
Matt Goff, soldier during the Irish War of Independence and full-back for Kildare in six All-Ireland finals
Steven Gray, former professional footballer in the League of Ireland and in Australia.
Arthur Guinness, co-owner with his brother Richard of the brewery business in Leixlip. Richard lived on the town's Main Street, and was the landlord of the Salmon Leap Inn.
Ana Kriégel, schoolgirl murdered in May 2018; the murderers were the youngest people convicted of murder in Ireland.
Fiachra Lennon, Irish international tennis player
David Matthews, athlete and holder of the Irish 800 metres record
Catherine Murphy (politician), politician, member of Dáil Éireann and co-leader/co-founder of the Social Democrats (Ireland)
Enda Murphy, former Kildare Gaelic football captain, and has represented Ireland in the International Rules Series
Gerard Nash, former professional footballer with Ipswich Town and current manager with Ipswich Town Reserves.
Clíona Ní Chiosáin, actress, television presenter, and teacher, known as the star of TG4's Aifric who attended Scoil Chearbhaill Uí Dhálaigh (primary school).
Andrew Omobamidele, professional footballer with Norwich City grew up in Leixlip and played for Leixlip United originally.
Jack O'Shea, Kerry Gaelic footballer
Arthur Price, Archbishop of Cashel, and benefactor of Guinness is buried beneath the aisle of St Mary's Church, Leixlip
Olamide Shodipo, professional footballer with Queens Park Rangers.
Eoghan Stokes, professional footballer

Sports

Athletics
Le Chéile Athletic Club was founded in 2003 to offer the youth of Leixlip, and trains at their facility at the Leixlip Amenities Centre.

Canoeing
Salmon Leap Canoe Club founded in 1961 is located on the banks of Leixlip Lake. The club won the Ribadesella trophy in 2017. One inspiration for the club was the international Liffey Descent canoe race from Straffan to Dublin, which passes through Leixlip and celebrated its 50th anniversary in 2009.

Gaelic games
Leixlip has two Gaelic Athletic Association clubs, Leixlip GAA founded in 1887 and Confey GAA founded recently in 1989.

Soccer
There are currently three amateur football clubs, Confey FC, St. Catherine's Park, Leixlip United F.C. Leixlip Amenities Centre, Liffeybank FC St.Catherine's Park. 
Confey FC play in the Leinster Senior League (men) and the Amateur League (over 35's). Leixlip United FC participate in Leinster Senior League (men), Amateur League (over 35's), Leinster Football League (men Under 20), Dublin & District Schoolboys/girls League (boys & girls), Eastern Women's Football League (women), Metropolitan Girls League (girls).
Liffeybank FC (called Leixlip Town 1995–2017) on the other hand participate in the Athletic Union League (men), Eastern Women's Football League (women), Metropolitan Girls League (girls) and the North Dublin Football League (boys).
Defunct football clubs in the town include Ormeau FC, Liffey Athletic, Barnhall Rovers, Liffey Park Hibernians (amalgamated with Leixlip Town 1999), Confey Celtic.

Rugby
Barnhall Rugby Football Club, a rugby union club, which competes in the All-Ireland League is also located on the outskirts of the town in Parsonstown.

Basketball
Liffey Celtics Basketball Club is the local basketball club for girls aged 7–18, and boys aged 7–18. Liffey Celtics' underage basketball teams compete in the Dublin Area Board League and Cup competitions. Training and home matches take place at the Leixlip Amenities Centre, Confey GAA hall, and Colaiste Cois Life (Lucan). The club has a senior women's team competing in the Basketball Ireland Premier League.

Fishing
Leixlip has been the host to coarse fishing competitions due to the permanently pegged stretch of the Royal Canal. The Leixlip stretch consists of 62 marked pegs and there is also the Confey stretch consisting of sixty pegs.
The Rye river runs through Carton Demesne and through the Intel Ireland site. The Leixlip stretch is controlled by the Leixlip and District Angling Association.

Golf, Pitch & Putt
Golfing facilities are available at Elm Hall Golf Club on the Loughlinstown Road as well as two 18 hole pitch & putt courses.

International relations

Twin towns – Sister cities
Leixlip is twinned with the following towns:

 Bressuire, France
 Niles, Illinois, United States

See also
 List of abbeys and priories in Ireland (County Kildare)
 List of towns and villages in Ireland
 Leixlip Louisa Bridge railway station
 Leixlip Confey railway station
 Guinness family
 Liffey Champion

References

External links

 Town Homepage
 

 
Towns and villages in County Kildare
Civil parishes of Newcastle, County Dublin
Civil parishes of County Kildare